In mathematics, Harish-Chandra's function may refer to:
 Harish-Chandra's c-function
 Harish-Chandra's σ function
 Harish-Chandra's Ξ function